This article contains information on Victorian Railways vehicles that do not fit into other categories. These were for the most part "one-offs", and many were not even classed.

Hospital car
After the collision at Sunshine in 1908, in which more than 440 people were killed or injured, the Victorian Railways decided to construct two hospital cars, to look after patients injured in a possible repeat of the incident.

The two cars were converted from second class passenger cars, B328 and B343 which had previously been A138 and A153. Both cars dated from 1883. The Hospital cars entered service on 24 December 1909, fitted with water, stretchers, rest beds and medical supplies.

The first car was scrapped in 1940, and the body sold to a property in Somerton. In 1949 it was sold again and moved to Bulla. The second car was scrapped in 1939.

Road vehicles converted to rail use

Motor cars altered for rail uses

Petrol Inspection Car
This was a small car numbered '1' and named the Inspection Car. It was built in England in 1923, but was not found in the 1936 stocktake.

Gang Motor
The eight-horsepower Gang Motor held five people, and was built at Arden Street in late 1923. In 1950 the vehicle was removed from the rolling stock register and given to "Way and Works" as a track motor.

Motor Car
The Motor Car was put into service in mid 1925, after being fitted with rail wheels in lieu of tyres. In 1927 the car was named "Mr Molomby's Inspection Car", and allocated to Seymour. It was scrapped in 1952.

Dodge Cars
In 1936 and 1937, six Dodge cars, built under licence by TJ Richards & Sons in Adelaide, were fitted with rail wheels. Although officially described as "Passenger and Mail Motors", they were put in the Rail Motor group and classed RM, with the numbers 70 to 75. They were used on branch lines with little traffic, and at least one became an inspection car for railway officials. They were removed from service and scrapped between 1953 and 1958.

One car (RM 74) has been preserved and is currently being restored by the Daylesford Spa Country Railway.

Road Transferable Locomotive
In about 1991, it was realised that running long freight trains was no longer economical, given the shift to road transport that had been taking place for nearly 40 years.

As a proposed solution to this, it was decided to purchase a Road Transferable Locomotive, essentially a truck fitted with retractable rail wheels. The truck was intended to haul short trains from three to maybe fifteen wagons, instead of a large locomotive with far more power than necessary.

The idea was that a number of wagons of the given type, would be left in a rail siding and the line shut off. When there was enough of a wheat harvest or other applicable traffic, the Melbourne-based RTL was to drive out to wherever the wagons were stored, and haul them to the nearest level crossing for loading. Once this was done, the RTL would haul its short train back to Melbourne, unload, and then return the wagons to their storage location. The RTL would then return to Melbourne by road, which was quicker given the condition of the freight rail network at the time.

This was intended to cut down on crews, because the RTL did not require crews to be stationed at remote locations - one or two crews would therefore be able to do the work of multiples.

An order was placed for three vehicles, and RTL1 began tests in 1995. It was tested north of Bendigo, but was only able to haul up to seven loaded bogie grain hopper wagons. Tyre failure became a constant problem, and so RTL2 and RTL3 have not been built.

RTL1 has been withdrawn from service due to the schemes failure. Since then it has been dismantled, converting it back to a standard road vehicle. Its future is unknown and is currently stored at Dynon depot.

Steam shovels
In the early 1900s the railways were beginning to invest in large infrastructure projects, which had been delayed considerably due to the 1890s depression. As a result, in 1907 and 1912 respectively, two steam shovels were built. There is no more information about the second shovel, but the first does have a detailed history.

Steam Shovel No.1 was used early in its life at the ballast pit at Mt. Ruse. During 1909 the shovel was constantly dismantled and moved to other locations, one example being Armadale, when the cutting was being constructed from South Yarra to Toorak during the quadruplication of the Caulfield line, to increase services to Frankston and Dandenong. Presumably the shovel was also used to dig out Camberwell station and parts of the Glen Waverley line. It is thought that this work was shared with shovels Ruston and Harmon owned by the construction branch.

During the shovel's use it was operated by a steam locomotive driver who was unfit for that work. The driver returned to other duties when the shovel was not required.

Testing vehicles

Dynagraph Car
This car had originally been built in 1858 as passenger car 69A. In 1880 it was fitted with Woods Hydraulic brake, then in 1889 this was swapped for a standard Westinghouse brake. In 1890 the car was marked for departmental use, and it is thought (from a note in the 1904 Diagrams book) that this meant it was to be used by Governors. In 1896 the car was converted to the Dynagraph.

The Dynagraph car was an early form of dynamometer car for testing tractive effort of locomotives. Peter Vincent has theorised that the car was introduced with the influence of Smith, the Chief Mechanical Engineer of the time who went to great efforts to standardise rolling stock equipment and saw the introduction of larger steam locomotives for the period.

The car was superseded by the larger Dynamometer Car of 1932. Correspondence in the mid 1940s shows that rail staff were keen to see the car kept for preservation; it was in storage at Newport Workshops at the time. Despite efforts of staff and a scrapping left to the decision of the Rail Commissioners as late as 1949, the car was scrapped in 1953. There was a rumour that, in true Railways fashion, the car 'caught fire' while waiting a scrap decision.

Dynamometer Car
By the late 1920s both the Victorian and South Australian railways had built much larger, more modern engines than those intended to be tested by the 1896 Dynagraph Car. As a result, that car was replaced with a more modern Dynamometer car, which provided much the same facilities but presumably with equipment upgrades to withstand the tripled force generated by some of the SAR's new steam locomotives. The new car entered service in 1932.

Almost immediately, the Victorian system used the car to test the differences in rolling resistances between trains of four wheel wagons and the new bogie stock purchased and built in the late 1920s. Quite a lot of this rollingstock, for example the E open wagons, had cousins in the SAR system of a similar, if not identical design.

Tests were also run on the S Class passenger locomotives. Included in the tests were tractive effort trials with loaded freight trains between Wallan and Seymour.

Other miscellaneous tests included suburban trials between Tait trains and the new Harris trains to service in the mid 1950s.

From 1932 to the 1970s, over 900 tests were logged.

Some of the last runs in Victoria were used to test radio reception for the installation of "Train-to-Base" radio and Alternate Safe Working, a radio based safeworking system.

Peter Vincent notes that there is a rumour which says the body of this car was taken from a steam railcar which ran from 1913-1927. To date no evidence has surfaced, although the body does look quite similar to that of the Kerr Stuart steam railmotor. However, a note at the bottom of the diagram for the Dynamometer car says that it was built in Adelaide.

Unclassed wagons

Workshops oil transfer wagon
Within the Victorian Railways there were some wagons which stayed within workshop compounds, and so were never taken out onto the mainline. Usually these wagons were conversions from "scrapped" wagons, and for the most part were un-numbered. There was one wagon which was unlike any others, recorded as the "Workshops Oil Transfer" wagon. It seems to have been in regular 'mainline' use between Ballarat and Newport. By 1975 it was stored at the latter, and it may still be there today.

1925 gas truck
In 1925 an underframe from a scrapped Y Class carriage was converted to hold some form of gas. There is very little information about its existence, but it is known that it had four wheels. It entered service in August 1925 and was scrapped in December 1937.

Pintsch gas Refuse
In 1933, wagon WT7 was converted to a "Coal Fuel Tank". Sometime in the next six years the classification was altered to "Fuel Oil Truck;', still retaining the number 7. In 1939 it was converted for a third time, to the "Pintsch Gas Refuse". This was done to collect the residue from conversions of shale oil to pintsch oil, which was used for lamps. The wagon had a capacity of 2000 gallons (9000 litres). It vanished from records after 1939 and was probably scrapped in the mid 1950s.

References

Further reading
 Peter J. Vincent: Hospital Car
 Peter J. Vincent: Motor Cars converted to rail use
 Peter J. Vincent: The Rail Transferable Locomotive
 Peter J. Vincent: Marion Steam Shovels
 Peter J. Vincent: The Dynagraph Car
 Peter J. Vincent: The Dynamometer Car
 Peter J. Vincent: The Unknown wagon
 Peter J. Vincent: 1925 Gas Truck
 Peter J. Vincent: Pintasch Gas Refuse

Victorian Railways carriages